Doxa Vyronas ( - Glory of Vyronas) is a football club based in Vyronas, an eastern suburb of Athens. The club, established in 1945, and currently competes in Delta Ethniki Regional Championship. Doxa currently use Municipal Stadium of Vyronas as the venue for their home matches.

History
Doxa Vyronas was founded in 1945. Club's shirt colour is blue. Its founders were Holopoulos and Panagiotis Ioannou. The first home ground of the club’s football team was “Anagnostopoulos Ground” which lied in the district of Amygdalies, just behind the shooting-field. The club's first participation in the official local championships of Athens came in 1949-1950 (EPSA 3d Division).
In 1963-64 it was the first time that Doxa promoted to Beta Ethniki, with Patrinos being the club’s chairman. The most remarkable and historic win of that season was a 1-0 defeat of Panachaiki in Patras. It was not until 1974-75 that Doxa returned to Beta Ethniki.
In 1980, under the guidance and financial support of chairman Staikos, Doxa managed to emerge from the amateur championships and gradually reach the Beta Ethniki professional division in 1992-93 and from 1994 to 1999. Since then, and after the retreat of Staikos from the administration of the club causing severe financial problems, Doxa were rapidly relegated level after level all the way down to the lowest division of Athens Local Championships (EPSA 3d Division).
Finally, after almost one decade in the amateur leagues of Athens, Doxa managed to take part in 2007-08 season of Delta Ethniki, after a successful merger with Proteas Palea Fokea. The club from Palea Fokea, Southern Attica, was dissolved thus letting its league position to the “blues” from Vyronas.

External links
- Official Webpage

 
Football clubs in Athens
Football clubs in Attica
Association football clubs established in 1945
1945 establishments in Greece